Dabur Ltd is an Indian multinational consumer goods company, founded by S. K. Burman and headquartered in Ghaziabad. It manufactures Ayurvedic medicine and natural consumer products, and is one of the largest fast-moving consumer goods (FMCG) companies in India. Dabur derives around 60% of its revenue from the consumer care business, 11% from the food business and remaining from the international business unit.

History
Dabur was founded in Kolkata by Dr. S. K. Burman in 1884. Burman's family had migrated from Punjab to Kolkata and are Punjabi Khatris by origin. In the mid-1880s, as an Ayurvedic practitioner in Kolkata, he formulated Ayurvedic medicines for diseases like cholera, constipation and malaria. As a qualified physician, he went on to sell his medicines in Bengal on a bicycle. His patients started referring him and his medicines as "Dabur", a portmanteau of the words daktar (doctor) and Burman. He later went on to mass-produce his Ayurvedic formulations.

C.L. Burman, set up Dabur's first R&D unit. Later, his grandson, G.C Burman was gherao-ed by his own workers during a labor unrest in Kolkata. Due to the unpleasant situation, G.C Burman decided to move the factory to Delhi, where his brothers later relocated. In Delhi, the business thrived and the company soon became headquartered there. In the words of business historian Sonu Bhasin "Calcutta's loss was Delhi's gain."

The current chairman, Dr. Anand Burman, and vice-chairman Amit Burman, are part of the fifth generation of the family. They were among the first business families in India to separate ownership from management, when they handed over the management of the company to professionals in 1998.

In 1997, Dabur set up a wholly-owned consumer goods subsidiary called Dabur Foods under which it launched its fruit juice brand called Real.

In 2022, Dabur acquired a 51% stake in the Indian spices company Badshah Masala for 588 crore.

Pharma and healthcare
Dabur demerged its pharma business in 2003 and hived it off into a separate company, Dabur Pharma Ltd. German company Fresenius SE bought a 73.27% equity share in Dabur Pharma in June 2008 at ₹76.50 a share.

Dabur International, a fully owned subsidiary of Dabur India formerly held shares in the UAE-based Weikfield International, which it sold in June 2012.

Philanthropy 
Dabur's Sustainable Development Society (Sundesh) is a non-profit organisation started by Burman that aims to carry out welfare activities in the spheres of health care, education and other socio-economic activities. Dabur drives its corporate social responsibility (CSR) initiatives through Sundesh.

The 2015 Brand Trust Report puts Dabur at 19th place.

Controversy
Former executive director Pradip Burman was on the list of black money account holders on 27 October 2014 when BJP government revealed the names. Dabur rejected the black money charge.

In December 2020, a report by the Centre for Science and Environment showed that Dabur Honey, along with other major brands' products, was adulterated with sugar syrup.

Hajmola or Hazmola is an ayurvedic digestive tablet sold as a treatment for dyspepsia by Dabur under that name since the 1950s. A counterfeit of the product was trademarked by "Hilal Foods (Pvt.) Limited" (estb. 1986), a Clifton, Karachi based company, in Pakistan which had been selling it since at least the 1980s. When Dabur began operating in Pakistan, it filed an intellectual property infringement suit against Hilal through its subsidiary which was ultimately settled by the Sindh High Court allowing both Hilal and Dabur to use the Hajmola trademark.

See also 
 Dabur Research Foundation
 Chyawanprash
 Babool (brand)

References

External links

 

Indian brands
Pharmaceutical companies of India
Ayurvedic companies
Dental companies
Food and drink companies of India
Pharmaceutical companies established in 1884
Companies based in Uttar Pradesh
Indian companies established in 1884
Companies listed on the National Stock Exchange of India
Companies listed on the Bombay Stock Exchange
Multinational companies headquartered in India
Dabur Group